Jonathon Taylor (born 12 September 1979) is a New Zealand soccer player. He plays as a defender.

Club career
He played for Napier City Rovers before joining Football Kingz in the Australian National Football League for 1 season, before returning to Napier.

He played the 2009/2010 season for Hawke's Bay United in the NZFC.

International career
Taylor made a solitary A-international appearance for the New Zealand national soccer team, the All Whites, in 2001, as New Zealand beat Cook Islands 2–0 in a world cup qualifier.

References

External links 
 

1979 births
Living people
New Zealand association footballers
New Zealand international footballers
Football Kingz F.C. players
Association football defenders